Power Home Remodeling is an American corporation headquartered in Chester, Pennsylvania that provides services predominantly related to energy and cost-saving exterior remodeling products such as replacement windows, roofing and vinyl siding.

Overview
Power Home Remodeling was founded in 1992 and experienced rapid growth in the last 6 years under the tenure of Corey Schiller and Asher Raphael, the company's current co-CEOs. In 2018, Qualified Remodeler listed Power as the largest residential re-roofer and the third largest home remodeling firm in the United States. In the last nine years, Power has grown from $100 million to $700 million in annual revenue.

Power Veterans Initiative  
Power Veterans Initiative (PVI) is an independent department within Power that is dedicated to helping veterans establish careers after the military. As of 2019, 13% of all new hires at Power and 8% of its workforce (6% increase since 2016) are military veterans and veteran spouses.

References

External links
 Official Website

Companies based in Delaware County, Pennsylvania
American companies established in 1992
1992 establishments in Pennsylvania
Privately held companies based in Pennsylvania